People of Walmart (PoW) is an entertainment website featuring user-submitted photos of Walmart customers considered to be socially awkward or undesirable by users of the site. PoW has been promoted largely on sites like Digg and Funny or Die, and linked on Facebook and Twitter. People of Walmart was founded in 2009 by brothers Andrew and Adam Kipple, and their friend Luke Wherry.

History 
The website was founded in August 2009 after three men in their 20s—Andrew Kipple, his brother Adam, and their friend Luke Wherry—noticed at a South Carolina Walmart a woman who looked like a stripper to them in a T-shirt that read "go f*** yourself" with a two-year-old in a harness and a man with a beard reminiscent of those worn by ZZ Top. They created the website to share what they find truly remarkable, ignoring more stereotypical "rednecks" or mullets. While they created the site for their own social circle, it immediately went viral, enabling Wherry and Adam Kipple to leave their prior jobs. Andrew Kipple is a student. Walmart has not commented.

In addition to avoiding the ordinary, the trio refuse to post photos of people who are disabled or working Walmart employees.

The site has given rise to various other similar websites, some with variations on the theme.

Site features 
The People of Walmart site is divided into tabs including photos (broken up into newest, top rated, by state, and random), stories (love letters and hate mail), videos, and a submit section. Users have the ability to rate the photos that are posted. There is also a store where items such as tee shirts, mugs, and sweatshirts can be purchased with the People of Walmart logo. According to the website, People of Walmart is a member of Three Ring Blogs, which includes blogs like “That’s my boss,” “dumbtweets,” “Girls in yoga pants,” and “How I was dumped." Three Ring Blogs is a network of blogs where people can post anonymous content, most of which has a humorous focus.

Backlash
Walmart spokesman David Tovar declined to comment saying in an e-mail that it "doesn't seem like it's news that there's a website that allows people to post photos on it".

A woman named Melanie Wheeler was extremely upset when she found her mother's embarrassing image on the site accompanied by the caption, "A member of the Canadian division of the Trench Coat Mafia." They contacted the press to express their disgust in the website and how they had felt violated. However, the People of Walmart FAQ states that if a user finds that they are unwillingly shown in a picture, "Simply email us and we will take it down, no problem.  If you like your photo but hate the caption or comment send us an email and we can remove it."

Social media
People of Walmart has a Facebook and Twitter account. There are also iPhone and Android applications that allow pictures to be uploaded to the site from a mobile device. In 2017, they announced the launch of a People of Walmart App for Android and iOS that allows anyone to post pictures what they found in Walmart, then show it on the app.

References

External links
 

American blogs
American comedy websites
Internet properties established in 2009
Photoblogs
Walmart
American photography websites